The men's 5000 metres race of the 2014–15 ISU Speed Skating World Cup 1, arranged in the Meiji Hokkaido-Tokachi Oval, in Obihiro, Japan, was held on 14 November 2014.

Sven Kramer of the Netherlands won, followed by Aleksandr Rumyantsev of Russia in second place, and Wouter olde Heuvel of the Netherlands in third place. Jan Szymański of Poland won Division B.

Results
The race took place on Friday, 14 November, with Division B scheduled in the morning session, at 10:54, and Division A scheduled in the afternoon session, at 15:00.

Division A

Division B

References

Men 5000
1